Sorde may refer to:
 Sorde-l'Abbaye, a commune in France
 Sorde, Manipur, a village in India

See also 
 Sord (disambiguation)